Luis Antonio García Anchundia (born September 20, 1993) is an Ecuadorian footballer. He currently plays striker for Barcelona.

External links
García's player card on FEF 

1993 births
Living people
People from Chone, Ecuador
Association football forwards
Ecuadorian footballers
Barcelona S.C. footballers